Ganapavaram is a village in Tripurantakam mandal, located in Prakasam district of Andhra Pradesh, India.

Geography

References

Villages in Prakasam district